Edward C. Swenson (1917 – December 31, 2001) was an American football, basketball, and soccer coach and college athletics administrator. He served as the head football coach at Bridgewater State College in Bridgewater, Massachusetts from 1960 to 1967. As the athletic director at Bridgewater State, Swenson was instrumental in getting football reinstated as a varsity sport in 1960 after the program had been shut down for 30 years. Swenson was also a founding member of the New England Football Conference.

Swenson died on December 31, 2001, in Lady Lake, Florida.

Head coaching record

Football

References

External links
 Bridgewater State Hall of Fame profile

1917 births
2001 deaths
Bridgewater State Bears athletic directors
Bridgewater State Bears football coaches
Bridgewater State Bears men's basketball coaches
College men's soccer coaches in the United States